Philip Matthew Whitehead (born 17 December 1969) is an English former professional football goalkeeper. He is mainly remembered for his playing days with Oxford United and Reading. At Reading he made some important penalty saves, including one against AFC Bournemouth's Richard Hughes in a 2–1 win and one against Cambridge United's Tom Youngs in a 2–2 draw. He also saved a crucial Scott Minto penalty during a shootout as Reading knocked Premier League side West Ham United out of the 2001–02 League Cup.

His career ended after he suffered a major injury playing for Tamworth during an FA Cup fourth qualifying round replay, although he attempted a short-lived comeback when he made one more appearance for Tamworth in an FA Trophy replay against Aldershot Town. He served Brentford as part-time goalkeeping coach during the 2004–05 season.

Career statistics

Club

References

External links

1969 births
Living people
Footballers from Halifax, West Yorkshire
English footballers
Halifax Town A.F.C. players
Barnsley F.C. players
Scunthorpe United F.C. players
Bradford City A.F.C. players
Oxford United F.C. players
West Bromwich Albion F.C. players
Reading F.C. players
Tranmere Rovers F.C. players
York City F.C. players
Tamworth F.C. players
Association football goalkeepers
Brentford F.C. non-playing staff